Efthymis Filippou (born 18 January 1977) is a Greek screenwriter, known for his collaborations with Yorgos Lanthimos. He was the winner of the Golden Osella Award for Best Screenplay at the 68th Venice International Film Festival in 2011, which he shared with Yorgos Lanthimos. In 2016, he was invited from the Academy of Motion Picture Arts and Sciences to become a member.

As an artist he uses the name Efthimis Filippou.

At the 89th Academy Awards, he received an Academy Award for Best Original Screenplay nomination for his work on The Lobster, with Yorgos Lanthimos.

Filmography

References

1977 births
Living people
European Film Award for Best Screenwriter winners
Greek screenwriters
Cannes Film Festival Award for Best Screenplay winners
Film people from Athens